Brila FM is a sports radio station founded on October 1, 2002, by Larry Izamoje as Nigeria's first and only sports radio station. Brila FM has four stations, in Lagos, Abuja, Onitsha, and Port Harcourt; it previously also broadcast in Kaduna. During the 2014 FIFA World Cup, the station was appointed as one of the three lead broadcast partners by Optima Sports Management International.

Programming
Brila FM focuses primarily on sports updates and analysis. In 2012, they signed a broadcasting partnership with talkSPORT to broadcast live Premier League match commentary until 2014.

Notable presenters
Ogechukwukanma Ogwo

See also
List of radio stations in Nigeria

References

Radio stations established in 2002
Radio stations in Lagos
Radio stations in Abuja
Radio stations in Onitsha
Radio stations in Port Harcourt
2002 establishments in Nigeria